The Bundesstraße 188 or B 188 is one of the longer German federal highways crossing northern Germany. It connects the B3 with the B5.

188
Roads in Lower Saxony
Roads in Saxony-Anhalt
Roads in Brandenburg